Acidianus rod-shaped virus 1 (ARV1), scientific name Itarudivurs ARV1, is an archaeal virus and the sole species in the genus Itarudivirus. Its only known host is Acidianus sp. Acii26.

References

Archaeal viruses
Ligamenvirales